Johanna Billing (born 1973) is a Swedish artist. Her work has been featured in major group exhibitions such as Dokumenta 12, Istanbul Biennial (2005) and the 50th Venice Biennale.

Life and work 
Johanna Billing was born 1973 in Jönköping, Sweden. She lives and works in Stockholm, Sweden. Billing studied at Konstfack University of Arts, Crafts and Design in Stockholm, Sweden graduating in 1999.

Recent works include: In Purple (2019), Pulheim Jam Session (2015) and I'm Gonna Live Anyhow Until I die (2012). Other significant works include: I'm Lost Without Your Rhythm (2009), Another Album (2006), You Don't Love Me Yet (2003) and Magical World (2005). Many of the film’s soundtracks exist as soundtrack records published by the german label Apparent Extent. Between 1998–2010 Billing ran the independent record label Make it Happen. The interest in music is also expressed through the long term and ongoing touring project You Don’t Love Me Yet (2002-2021) in which over 300 artists and groups in different cities have interpreted the song with the same title, originally written by Roky Erickson 1984.

Exhibitions 
Billing has exhibited internationally. Selected solo exhibitions include: 
 2021: In Purple, Konsthall 16, Riksidrottsmuseet, Stockholm, Sweden
 2020: In Purple, Hollybush Gardens, London, United Kingdom
 2019: In Purple, Stadsbiblioteket, Jönköping, Sweden  
 2017: Jam Session, with Betty Bailey, Et al., San Francisco, United States  
 2017: About Art: I'm Lost Without Your Rhythm, Trondheim Kunstmuseum, Trondheim, Norway
 2016: Keeping Time, Villa Croce, Genova, Italy
 2015: Pulheim Jam Session, Hollybush Gardens, London, United Kingdom
 2014: I'm Gonna Live Anyhow Until I Die, Fieromilanocity, Milan, Italy
 2012: I’m Gonna Live Anyhow until I Die, The Mac, Belfast, Northern Ireland, United Kingdom
 2011: I'm Lost Without Your Rhythm, Crystal, Stockholm, Sweden
 2010: I'm Lost Without Your Rhythm, Modern Art Oxford, Oxford, United Kingdom
 2009: I'm Lost Without Your Rhythm, Camden Art Centre, London, United Kingdom
 2009: This Is How We Walk On the Moon, Mercer Union, Toronto, Canada
 2008: This Is How We Walk On the Moon, Malmö Konsthall, Malmö, Sweden
 2007: Forever Changes, Museum for Gegenwartskunst, Basel, Schweiz
 2007: Keep on Doing, DCA, Dundee Contemporary Art Center, Dundee, United Kingdom
 2007: Another Album and other films, Jönköpings Konstmuseum, Jönköpings, Sweden
 2007: Another Album, Hollybush Gardens, London, United Kingdom
 2006: Magical World, PS.1, New York, United States
 2005: Magical World, Hollybush Gardens, London, United Kingdom
 2001: Where She Is At, Moderna Museet Projekt, Stockholm, Sweden
 2001: Where She Is At, Oslo Kunsthall, Oslo, Norway

Notable works
 In Purple (2019)
 Pulheim Jam Session (2015)
 I’m Gonna Live Anyhow until I Die (2012)
 I'm Lost Without Your Rhythm  (2009)
 This Is How We Walk On the Moon (2007)
 Another Album (2006)
 Magic & Loss  (2005)
 Magical World  (2005)
 You Don't Love Me Yet  (2003)
 Where She Is At  (2001)
 Missing Out (2001)
 Project For a Revolution  (2000)
 Graduate Show  (1999)

Publications 

Johanna Billing - Works [Paperback]
 Johanna Billing: Look Behind Us a Blue Sky [Hardback]

References

External links
Official website

1973 births
Living people
Swedish contemporary artists
Swedish video artists
21st-century Swedish women artists
21st-century Swedish artists